O Príncipe (lit. "The Prince") is a 2002 Brazilian drama film directed and written by Ugo Giorgetti and starring Eduardo Tornaghi, Bruna Lombardi, Ricardo Blat, Ewerton de Castro and Otávio Augusto.

The plot of the film follows the story of Gustavo (Eduardo Tornaghi), a middle-aged intellectual man, who lives in Paris for more than 20 years, after leaving Brazil because of the coup d'état. After many years, he returns to São Paulo, due to the illness of his mother, in an opportunity to discover a country that he does not recognize anymore.

Cast

Eduardo Tornaghi as Gustavo
Bruna Lombardi as Maria Cristina
Ricardo Blat as Mário
Ewerton de Castro as Marino Esteves
Otávio Augusto as Renato
Elias Andreato as Aron
Márcia Bernardes as Hilda
Bruno Giordano	as School principal
Luis Guilherme	as Rudolf
Lígia Cortez as Miriam
Henrique Lisboa as Amaro
Júlio Medaglia as Conductor

References

External links
 

Brazilian drama films
2002 drama films
2002 films
Films set in São Paulo
Films shot in São Paulo
Films about Brazilian military dictatorship
2000s Portuguese-language films